Dysoxylum mollissimum subsp. molle, the red bean or Miva mahogany, is a rainforest tree in the family Meliaceae. It occurs in tropical, sub-tropical and littoral rainforests in eastern Australia, as far southwards as north-eastern New South Wales. Also occurs in Malesia and the south-western Pacific Islands. In Australia it is distributed from the Bellinger River in New South Wales in the south, to the wet tropics of north-eastern Queensland. The specific epithet mollissimum is from the Latin, meaning "very soft", describing the soft hairy leaflets. A signposted red bean tree may be seen near the car park of Victoria Park Nature Reserve in north-eastern New South Wales.

Description
It is usually buttressed or flanged at the base. The trunk is scaly and rough, grey or brown in colour. Freshly cut bark has an onion type scent.

Leaves
Leaflets are usually opposite on the stem, without serrations, and distinctly asymmetrical at the leaf base. Leaf stem swollen where joining the larger branch. Leaf venation is evident above and below, but raised and more noticeable below. Net veins easily seen. Veins creamy green, contrasting with the darker leaf colour.

Flowers and fruit
White flowers form on panicles from January to July. There is one reddish brown seed in each of the one to five cells. The fruit ripens between November and March. The fruit is bird attracting. Fresh seed is advised for regeneration.

Conservation
This species has been assessed by the IUCN and the Queensland Department of Environment and Science as least concern.

Timber
The tree produces a well regarded mahogany timber, suited to cabinet work, carving and boat building. It is Reddish brown and easily worked, Sapwood is creamy pink. and not resistant to termites. There is concern of inhaling wood dust from this tree.

References

mollissimum subsp. molle
Flora of New South Wales
Flora of Queensland
Trees of Australia
Sapindales of Australia
Plant subspecies